Creanga River may refer to:

Creanga, a tributary of the river Brad in Romania
Creanga Mică, a tributary of the river Târnava Mare in Romania
Creanga Mare, a tributary of the river Târnava Mică in Romania

See also 
Creangă (surname)